Buckeye Creek may refer to:

Buckeye Creek (Apple Creek), a stream in Missouri
Buckeye Creek (Cedar Creek), a tributary of Cedar Creek in the Skunk River watershed in Iowa
Buckeye Creek (East Walker River), a tributary of the East Walker River in California
Buckeye Creek (Georgia), a tributary of the Oconee River
Buckeye Creek (Gualala River), a tributary of the Gualala River in California
Buckeye Creek (Iowa River), a tributary of the Iowa River in Iowa
Buckeye Creek (Nevada), a tributary of the East Fork Carson River
Buckeye Creek (Ohio), a tributary of Salt Lick Creek in the Scioto River watershed
Buckeye Creek (Oklahoma), a tributary of the Deep Fork River
Buckeye Creek (Sacramento River), a tributary of the Sacramento River in California
Buckeye Creek (West Virginia), a tributary of Middle Island Creek

See also
Buckeye Fork